Louis G. Spadia (January 11, 1921 – February 17, 2013) was an American football executive who was the General Manager of the San Francisco 49ers for 25 seasons.  He was also the founder of the Bay Area Sports Hall of Fame.

Early life and education
Louis Spadia was born on January 11, 1921, in San Francisco, California. He went to Mission High School. He played baseball and was a star Second Baseman. He wanted to be a Major League Baseball player but couldn't because of being drafted into World War II.

Professional career

San Francisco 49ers
Instead of becoming a baseball player, he worked as a Special Assistant and Ticket Manager for the San Francisco 49ers in their inaugural season. In 1947 he was their Equipment Manager and was promoted in 1948 to be a Business Manager. In 1952 he became their General Manager and was the Manager for the next 25 seasons. In 1967 he also became the Team's president. He retired after 1976.

Bay Area Sports Hall of Fame
In 1979, he became the founder of the Bay Area Sports Hall of Fame. He served as the president and CEO until 2003. He was inducted into the Hall of Fame in 1999.

Death
Spadia died on February 17, 2013, at the age of 92.

References

1921 births
2013 deaths
American military personnel of World War II
Businesspeople from San Francisco
Military personnel from California
National Football League general managers
San Francisco 49ers executives